is a retired Japanese women's professional shogi player ranked 4-dan.

Personal life
Takamure is married to professional shogi player Yasuaki Tsukada, but plays professionally under her maiden name. The couple's daughter Erika is also a women's professional shogi player.

Promotion history
Takamura's promotion history is as follows:
1986, March 1: 3-kyū
1987, April 1: 1-dan
1994, March 22: 2-dan
2000, June 30: 3-dan
2018, January 21: 4-dan
2020, March 31: Retired

Note: All ranks are women's professional ranks.

Awards and honors
Takamure received the Japan Shogi Association's received the "25 Years Service Award" in recognition of being an active professional for twenty-five years in 2010.

References

External links
 ShogiHub: Takamure, Sachiko

Japanese shogi players
Living people
Women's professional shogi players
1971 births
People from Akita Prefecture
Professional shogi players from Akita Prefecture